The men's javelin throw at the 1938 European Athletics Championships was held in Paris, France, at Stade Olympique de Colombes on 3 September 1938.

Medalists

Results

Final
3 September

Participation
According to an unofficial count, 11 athletes from 8 countries participated in the event.

 (2)
 (2)
 (2)
 (1)
 (1)
 (1)
 (1)
 (1)

References

Javelin throw
Javelin throw at the European Athletics Championships